Héctor Ivan Palacio Montoya (born 12 May 1969) is a Colombian former professional  cyclist. During the 1992 Olympic Games, Palacio represented Colombia in the individual road race, where he finished 52nd. He most notably won the Vuelta a Colombia in 2000.

Major results

1990
 3rd Overall Vuelta a Costa Rica
1991
 1st  Team time trial, Pan American Games
1994
 National Road Championships
3rd Road race
3rd Time trial
 9th Overall Vuelta a Colombia
1st Stage 4
1995
 6th Overall Vuelta a Colombia
1st Stage 9
1996
 2nd Overall Vuelta a Colombia
1st Stages 4 & 13
1997
 1st  Mountains classification, Volta a Catalunya
 1st Overall 
 2nd Overall Clásico RCN
1st Stage 4
 3rd Overall Vuelta a Colombia
1st Stage 1
1998
 7th Overall Vuelta a Colombia
1st Stage 12
1999
 1st Stage 6 Vuelta a Colombia
2000
 1st  Overall Vuelta a Colombia
1st Stage 5
 1st Stage 2 Clásico RCN

References

External links

1969 births
Living people
Colombian male cyclists
Cyclists at the 1991 Pan American Games
Cyclists at the 1992 Summer Olympics
Olympic cyclists of Colombia
People from Envigado
Vuelta a Colombia stage winners
Pan American Games competitors for Colombia
Sportspeople from Antioquia Department
Pan American Games medalists in cycling
20th-century Colombian people
21st-century Colombian people
Medalists at the 1991 Pan American Games
Pan American Games gold medalists for Colombia